Under the Boardwalk is a 1989 American teen romance/drama film directed by Fritz Kiersch and starring Keith Coogan and Danielle von Zerneck.

Plot
It is the final weekend of summer and a group of Californian teenagers are looking forward to an upcoming surf contest. Rival gangs the 'Vals' and the 'Lowks' are confident that they will take home the trophy, but things become complicated when Reef Yorpin (Steve Monarque) - leader of the Lowks - discovers his sister Allie (Danielle von Zerneck) has fallen in love with 'Val' surfer Nick (Richard Joseph Paul) after meeting at a beach party.

See also
List of American films of 1989

References

External links

1989 romantic drama films
1989 films
American romantic drama films
1980s teen drama films
American teen drama films
Films directed by Fritz Kiersch
Films scored by David Kitay
New World Pictures films
1980s English-language films
1980s American films